Mambai may be:

Mambai language (Cameroon)
Mambai language (Timor)